Petcu is a Romanian surname. It is a Bulgarian given name, therefore a conclusion can be drawn as to the ethnic origin of Romanians having that given name as a surname. It may refer to:
Ioan Petcu (born 1959), Romanian footballer
Ioana Petcu-Colan (born 1978), Irish violinist of Romanian origin living in Barcelona, Spain
Răzvan Petcu (born 1973), retired Romanian freestyle and butterfly swimmer
Sorin Petcu (born 1974), Romanian sprint canoeist
Ştefan Petcu (born 1957), Romanian footballer

Romanian-language surnames